Corinne "Cori" Morris (born June 21, 1971 as Corinne Bartel) is a Canadian curler from Calgary, Alberta. She played lead for the Olympic silver medal-winning Cheryl Bernard rink from 2005 to 2011. Currently, she plays lead for Susan O'Connor, another member of that team.

Morris grew up in Lanigan, Saskatchewan. In 1998, Morris played in Ontario, and played in the provincial Scott Tournament of Hearts, as an alternate player for the Cheryl McBain team. She would later move to Alberta. Morris joined Bernard in 2005 after playing for Heather Rankin. She has since been to the 2007 and 2009 Scotties Tournament of Hearts as a member of that team.  At the 2009 Tournament of Hearts, Morris was presented with the Marj Mitchell Sportsmanship Award.

Morris and her team represented Canada in the 2010 Winter Olympics, and won silver medals at the tournament.

Morris is a graduate from the University of Ottawa and is employed as a professional recruiter. She married 1994 World Junior Champion Sean Morris in 2010.

On February 8, 2011, it was announced that the Bernard team would disband at the end of the 2010–11 curling season. Morris joined a new team for the 2011–12 curling season, playing as lead under Dana Ferguson.

She currently coaches the Kayla Skrlik team and works as a Talent Acquisition Partner for ATB Financial.

References

External links

Curlers from Ontario
Curlers from Calgary
Sportspeople from Humboldt, Saskatchewan
1971 births
Living people
Curlers at the 2010 Winter Olympics
University of Ottawa alumni
Olympic silver medalists for Canada
Olympic curlers of Canada
Olympic medalists in curling
Medalists at the 2010 Winter Olympics
People from Lanigan, Saskatchewan
Canadian women curlers
Canada Cup (curling) participants
Canadian curling coaches